The 2007-08 European Badminton Circuit season started in July 2007 and ended in April 2008.

Results

Winners

Performance by countries
Tabulated below are the Circuit performances based on countries. Only countries who have won a title are listed:

References 

European Badminton Circuit
European Badminton Circuit
European Badminton Circuit seasons